Kelton B. Garwood, also known and credited as Jonathan Harper, and John Harper, (May 21, 1928 – July 28, 1991) was an American actor on stage, film and television, perhaps best known as undertaker Percy Crump on the western television show Gunsmoke.

Career
Garwood received a degree in Theatrical Arts from the Ohio University, after which he performed on stage as a leading man. Director Blake Edwards was so impressed that he arranged for Garwood to begin a film career, with a supporting role of Magician in the 1959 episode "Murder on the Midway" of the television series Peter Gunn. Afterwards, he became a notable supporting character actor in over 45 features, often portraying husbands, fathers, eccentrics, aristocrats, cowboys, sheriffs, policemen, reporters, detectives, clerks, and in his later years, patriarchs.

His film career including roles in The Miracle of the Hills (1959), The Story of Ruth (1960), The Wizard of Baghdad (1961), Move Over, Darling (1963), The Sandpiper (1965), A Covenant with Death (1967), Big Daddy (1969), and Return to Snowy River (1988).

On television, he was a familiar face in the guest cast of Bachelor Father, The Big Valley, Captain Nice, The Danny Kaye Show, Destry, I Dream of Jeannie, Empire, Get Smart, The Girl from U.N.C.L.E., Have Gun – Will Travel, Hondo, Hotel de Paree, Iron Horse, Laredo, The Magical World of Disney, The Man from U.N.C.L.E., The Many Loves of Dobie Gillis, Mister Ed, The Monkees, The Munsters, Overland Trail, Rawhide, The Rebel, The Red Skelton Hour, The Rifleman, Ripcord, Sea Hunt, Tales of Wells Fargo, Tate, Two Faces West, The Untouchables, Wagon Train, The Waltons and of course twelve appearances on Gunsmoke, nine of which are as Undertaker Percy Crump. In The Twilight Zone, he guest-starred as the hobo in the episode "Five Characters in Search of an Exit". He also played the recurring role of the character Beauregard O'Hanlon in Bourbon Street Beat.

On stage, his appearances include the play A Touch of the Poet (1963).

Personal life
From 1958 until his death, Garwood was married to interior designer Janet Garwood and the couple had two sons, one of whom became professional golfer Doug Garwood.

Filmography
A partial filmography follows.

Film

 The Miracle of the Hills (1959)
 The Story of Ruth (1960)
 The Wizard of Baghdad (1961)
 Move Over, Darling (1963)
 The Sandpiper (1965)
 A Covenant with Death (1967)
 Big Daddy (1969)
 Return to Snowy River (1988)

Television

References

External links

1928 births
1991 deaths
People from Columbus, Ohio
Male actors from Columbus, Ohio
American male film actors
American male television actors
20th-century American male actors
American male stage actors
Ohio University alumni
Western (genre) television actors